Babhulgaon is a Village and tehsil in Sengaon subdivision of Hingoli district  in the state of Maharashtra, India.

Demographics
 India census, Babhulgaon had a population of 2589. Males constitute 52% of the population and females 48%. Babhulgaon has an average literacy rate of 47%, lower than the national average of 59.5%; with 66% of the males and 34% of females literate. 17% of the population is under 6 years of age.

References

Talukas in Maharashtra
Cities and towns in Hingoli district